Lin Ye (born 1974) is a Chinese chess player, Woman FIDE Master (WFM), and chess arbiter.

Biography
In 1995, Lin Ye participated in Women's World Chess Championship Interzonal Tournament in Chişinău where ranked 40th place.

Lin Ye is known as a prominent chess tournament arbiter. In 2008, she became a FIDE Arbiter (FA), and in 2011 she received the International Arbiter (IA) title. She was a 2010 Asian Games chess tournament arbiter and 2011 Summer Universiade chess tournament arbiter.

References

External links
 
 
 

1974 births
Living people
Chinese female chess players
Chess Woman FIDE Masters
Chess arbiters